Brick Factory 3 is a mixtape by American rapper Gucci Mane. The album serves as the third installment in his popular Brick Factory series. The mixtape was released on February 12, 2015, by 1017 Records and 101 Distribution. The album features guest appearances from Peewee Longway, Young Thug and Lil B.

Track listing

References

2015 albums
Gucci Mane albums
Sequel albums
Albums produced by Zaytoven
Albums produced by Nard & B
Albums produced by Metro Boomin